The First Presbyterian Church is a historic church in Little Rock, Arkansas. It was designed by architect John Parks Almand and was built in 1921.  It is a high quality local interpretation of the Gothic Revival style.  It was listed on the National Register of Historic Places in 1986.

John Parks Almand had worked in the firm of Charles L. Thompson prior to this design commission.  It was done for a congregation established in 1828, the oldest Presbyterian congregation in the state.

See also
National Register of Historic Places listings in Little Rock, Arkansas

References

Churches on the National Register of Historic Places in Arkansas
Churches completed in 1921
Churches in Little Rock, Arkansas
National Register of Historic Places in Little Rock, Arkansas
1921 establishments in Arkansas